25E-NBOMe (2C-E-NBOMe, NBOMe-2C-E) is a derivative of the phenethylamine 2C-E. It acts in a similar manner to related compounds such as 25I-NBOMe, which are potent agonists at the 5HT2A receptor. 25E-NBOMe has been sold as a drug and produces similar effects in humans to related compounds such as 25I-NBOMe and 25C-NBOMe.

Legality

United Kingdom

Sweden
Sweden's public health agency classified 25E-NBOMe as a narcotic substance, on January 18, 2019.

See also
 25E-NBOH (NBOH-2C-E)
 25D-NBOMe (NBOMe-2C-D)
 25P-NBOMe (NBOMe-2C-P)
 25I-NBOMe (NBOMe-2C-I)
 25B-NBOMe (NBOMe-2C-B)
 25C-NBOMe (NBOMe-2C-C)
 2C-TFM-NBOMe (NBOMe-2C-TFM)

References

25-NB (psychedelics)
Designer drugs